Qingdao No. 1 Middle School of Shandong Province is a high school in Qingdao, Shandong, China.

School History 
February 1924 to October 1924, the school was located in Dengzhou Road.

October 1924 to April 1938, the school was relocated in Zhanshanda Road.

September 1938 to 1952, the school was relocated in Guizhou Road Primary School.

1952 to now, the school was relocated in Shanxian Road.

Notable alumni 
Luo Gan
Zhang Ruimin
Huang Xiaoming

See also 
Education in the People's Republic of China
National College Entrance Examination
Imperial examination

External links 
 Official website of Qingdao No. 1 High School 

High schools in Shandong
Education in Qingdao